Selania capparidana is a moth of the family Tortricidae. It was described by Philipp Christoph Zeller in 1847 and is found in Europe.

Description
The wingspan is 9–10 mm.

The larvae feed on the caper bush (Capparis spinosa), mining the leaves of their host plant. The mine has the form of a full-depth corridor, which later becomes more blotch-like. A single larva makes several mines. Larvae of the summer generation feed in the shoots, buds and fruits of their host plant. Pupation takes place outside of the mine.

Distribution
The moth is found in the Balearic Islands, Spain, Sardinia, Italy and Greece.

References

 

Grapholitini
Leaf miners
Moths described in 1847
Moths of Europe
Taxa named by Philipp Christoph Zeller